Jean-Luc Le Magueresse (born 25 April 1961) is a French former professional footballer who played as a defender. In his career, he played for Brest, Matra Racing, Lens, and Guingamp. As of 2021, he works in the commercial departments of his former club Brest.

Early life 
Jean-Luc Le Magueresse was born on 25 April 1961 in La Rochelle, Nouvelle-Aquitaine. His ancestors are originally from Pluméliau, Guénin, and  Remungol, towns in the Brittany region of France. His surname in Breton, Ar Magerez, means La Nourrice, translating to nanny.

Career 
Le Magueresse is a youth product of INF Vichy. He left the academy in 1980 to join Division 2 club Brest, where he would win the title and achieve promotion to the Division 1 in his first season. In 1986, he joined Division 1 club RC Paris (renamed Matra Racing in 1987). After two seasons in Paris, he joined fellow first-tier side Lens. However, after only one season in Lens during which the club was relegated, he returned to his native region of Brittany to play for Guingamp. Le Magueresse retired at the club in 1991. During his career, he made a total of 155 Division 1 appearances and 45 Division 2 appearances.

Personal life 
Jean-Luc is the father of singer Nolwenn Leroy. He divorced from Nolwenn's mother Muriel Leroy in 1993.

In the 2010s decade, Le Magueresse was a technical adviser for TV Breizh. In 2009, he began working in the commercial departments of his former club Brest.

Honours 
Brest
 Division 2: 1980–81

Notes

References 

1961 births
Living people
Sportspeople from La Rochelle
Footballers from Brittany
French people of Breton descent
French footballers
Association football defenders
INF Vichy players
Stade Brestois 29 players
Racing Club de France Football players
RC Lens players
En Avant Guingamp players
Ligue 2 players
Ligue 1 players
Footballers from Nouvelle-Aquitaine